Whom the Gods Love, also known as Mozart, is a 1936 British biographical film directed by Basil Dean and starring Stephen Haggard, Victoria Hopper and John Loder. The film portrays the life of the Eighteenth Century Austrian composer Wolfgang Amadeus Mozart.

Cast
 Stephen Haggard as Wolfgang Amadeus Mozart
 Victoria Hopper as Constance Mozart
 John Loder as Prince Lobkowitz
 Liane Haid as Aloysia
 Jean Cadell as Frau Mozart
 Hubert Harben as Leopold Mozart
 Frederick Leister as Emperor
 Marie Lohr as Empress
 Laurence Hanray as Archbishop of Salzburg
 George Curzon as Lorenzo Da Ponte
 Richard Goolden as Weber
 Muriel George as Frau Weber
 Raymond Huntley as Langer
 Leueen MacGrath as Josefa Weber

Bibliography
 Harper, Sue. Picturing the Past: The Rise and Fall of the British Costume Film. British Film Institute, 1994.

External links

 Whom the Gods Love on All About Mozart

1936 films
1930s musical drama films
1930s historical musical films
British black-and-white films
British historical musical films
British musical drama films
Films directed by Basil Dean
Associated Talking Pictures
Films about classical music and musicians
Films about composers
Films set in the 1770s
Films set in the 1780s
Films set in the 1790s
Films set in Vienna
Films shot in London
Films shot in Vienna
Cultural depictions of Joseph II, Holy Roman Emperor
Films about Wolfgang Amadeus Mozart
1936 drama films
Biographical films about composers
1930s English-language films
1930s British films